The  is an  Japanese railway line in Fukuoka prefecture, run by the private railway operator Nishitetsu. It links Kaizuka Station in Higashi-ku, Fukuoka with Nishitetsu Shingū Station in Shingū. It connects to the Kashii Line of JR Kyushu at Wajiro, and the Hakozaki Line of Fukuoka City Subway at Kaizuka.

Until then, the line was called .

Station list

History
The Hakata Bay Railway opened the  gauge Shinhakata to Wajiro line in 1924, and extended the line to Miyajidake the following year. The line was electrified at 1,500 V DC in 1929. The company merged with the Nishi-Nippon Railway in 1942.

The line was grade separated over the JR Kashii Line at Wajiro Station in 1966, and CTC signalling was commissioned in 1978.

In 1986, the Shinhakata to Kaizuka section was closed and replaced by the Fukuoka City Subway Hakozaki Line.

In 2007, the 10 km Nishitetsu Shingū to Tsuyazaki section closed due to declining patronage.

References
This article incorporates material from the corresponding article in the Japanese Wikipedia.

Nishi-Nippon Railroad
Kaizuka Line
Railway lines in Japan
Rail transport in Fukuoka Prefecture
1067 mm gauge railways in Japan